A list of American feature films released in 1930.

All Quiet on the Western Front won the Academy Award for Best Picture.

A

B

C

D-F

G-K

L-N

O-Q

R-S

T-Z

See also
1930 in American television
1930 in the United States

References

External links

1930 films at the Internet Movie Database

Film
1930
Lists of 1930 films by country or language